Noa Nadruku (born 19 September 1967) is a Fijian former rugby footballer who played in the 1980s and 1990s. After representing Fiji in rugby union, he switched to play rugby league in Australia for the Canberra Raiders (92 games between 1993 and 1997) and was named as one of the best 25 players for the Raiders' 25-year anniversary.

Background
Noa Nadruku was born in Namatakula, Fiji.

His usual position was running on the sideline, scoring hectic tries, generally using a cracking goosestep to leave defenders in his wake.  In addition to winning the 1994 Grand Final with the Raiders, in 1993 and 1996 he was the top try-scorer in the League. The "Noa Nadruku Trophy" is awarded to the Australia Fijian Rugby League's player of the year.

Playing career

Rugby Union
Nadruku first played international rugby union for Fiji in 1988 and played a total of five games for Fiji between then and 1991.

Rugby League

In 1993, while playing in the Rugby League World Sevens for Fiji, he was spotted by Canberra Raiders coach Tim Sheens and invited to train with the team. He had a slow start to the 1993 NSWRL season, but against Cronulla in the fifth round Nadruku scored two tries, setting up several others. Against Manly-Warringah Nadruku created even more of an impression with strong defence to complement his powerful running. By the end of the year Nadruku had scored a club record 22 tries in just twenty games – being the first player to score more than one try per game in a full season since Larry Corowa had scored 24 tries in 22 games for Balmain in 1978.

A serious injury kept Nadruku off the field for the first half of 1994, but by the finals he was back at his best. Though he received criticism for suspect under the high ball in early finals games against North Sydney and Canterbury-Bankstown, Nadruku was one of Canberra's best in their 36–12 victory over Canterbury in the Grand Final, scoring a try, making several powerful runs, and involving himself throughout. During the season Nadruku scored 12 tries in 15 games, but his club record of 22 in a season was equaled by fullback Brett Mullins.

After an ordinary season by his own high standards in 1995, Nadruku played for Fiji in the 1995 World Cup. Nadruku, Mullins and Laurie Daley held the Raiders together in a 1996 season decimated by injuries to Ricky Stuart and Bradley Clyde and suspensions to Kiwi props John Lomax and Quentin Pongia. This season he was again the League's top try-scorer, scoring 21 tries in 21 games.

A dispute over an off-field incident in which Nadruku was charged led to his sacking from the Raiders at the end of 1997. Nadruku finished his career with the North Queensland Cowboys under his old coach Tim Sheens, often playing centre (where he had played most of his rugby union) but retaining his trademark power and pace.

References

External links
Noa Nadruku at fijirugbyunion.com
Noa Nadruku at stats.rleague.com
raiders.com.au player listing

1967 births
Fijian rugby union players
Fiji international rugby union players
Fijian rugby league players
Canberra Raiders players
North Queensland Cowboys players
Fiji national rugby league team players
Dual-code rugby internationals
Living people
Australian people of I-Taukei Fijian descent
Rugby league wingers
Rugby union centres
Rugby league centres
People from Namatakula
I-Taukei Fijian people
Fijian emigrants to Australia